is a Japanese race car driver.

Kurosawa raced in All-Japan Formula Three from 1988 to 1989, Japanese Formula 3000 from 1990 to 1995 and the JGTC series from 1994 to 1999, also driving in the 1998 24 Hours of Le Mans, finishing 10th.

Kurosawa then obtained sponsorship to drive in the American CART series for Dale Coyne Racing in 2000. He made eight starts with a best finish of 12th at the Detroit Grand Prix. He became the first Japanese driver to lead a Champ Car race when he led seven laps at the Long Beach Grand Prix.

Kurosawa then returned to JGTC for the next three seasons, drove in the Super Taikyu series in 2004. He currently competes in the Super GT series, driving a Porsche Boxster for Arktech Motorsports.

Takuya is son of Best Motoring presenter, Motoharu Kurosawa and is elder brother of Haruki and Tsubasa, who all are racing drivers.

Racing record

Complete Japanese Formula 3000 Championship/Formula Nippon results 
(key) (Races in bold indicate pole position) (Races in italics indicate fastest lap)

Complete Japanese Touring Car Championship (1994-) results

JGTC/Super GT results  
(key) (Races in bold indicate pole position) (Races in italics indicate fastest lap)

Complete CART results
(key)

Complete 24 Hours of Le Mans results

References

External links
Official page
Super GT/JGTC Series bio 
CART statistics at ChampCarStats.com

1962 births
Champ Car drivers
Japanese Formula 3000 Championship drivers
Japanese IndyCar Series drivers
Formula Nippon drivers
Japanese Formula 3 Championship drivers
Super GT drivers
24 Hours of Le Mans drivers
Japanese Touring Car Championship drivers
Japanese racing drivers
Living people

Nismo drivers
Team LeMans drivers
Nakajima Racing drivers
Mugen Motorsports drivers
Dale Coyne Racing drivers
TOM'S drivers